Rhinodrilus fafner is a presumed extinct giant earthworm from the family Glossoscolecidae. It is only known by the ill-preserved holotype discovered in 1912 near Belo Horizonte in the Brazilian state of Minas Gerais and described in 1918 by German zoologist Wilhelm Michaelsen (1860–1937) from the National History Museum in Hamburg. The collected individual has a length of 210 centimetre and the body which consists of 600 single segments is 24 millimetre in diameter. Along with Amynthas mekongianus (Cognetti, 1922) and Megascolides australis, Rhinodrilus fafner is among the largest known giant earthworms. Rhinodrilus fafner was confined to a small habitat and vanished possibly due to habitat destruction. It was officially declared extinct by the Brazilian Ministry of Environment (MMA) in 2003. However, the rediscoveries of the Giant Palouse earthworm in 2005 and the Brazilian earthworm Fimoscolex sporadochaetus in 2007 created hope that Rhinodrilus fafner may be found again.

References

John Stephenson (1930): The Oligochaeta. Clarendon Press, Oxford, pp. 978. 
Fattima M. S. Moreira, José Oswaldo Siqueira, Lijbert Brussaard (2005): Soil Biodiversity in Amazonian and Other Brazilian Ecosystems. CABI. 
Wilhelm Michaelsen (1918): Die Lumbriciden, mit besonderer Berücksichtigung der bisher als Familie Glossoscolecidae zusammengefaßten Unterfamilien. In: Zoologische Jahrbücher. Vol. 41:1 - 398, Abteilung für Systematik, Geographie und  Biologie der Tiere, Gustav Fischer Verlag, Jena.

External links 
Body Size Range 
Oligochaeta (Italian)

Haplotaxida
Animals described in 1918
Extinct invertebrates since 1500
Extinct animals of South America
Fauna of Brazil